Atheist Manifesto may refer to

An Atheist Manifesto (1954) by Joseph L. Lewis
Atheïstisch manifest en De onredelijkheid van religie (1995) (in Dutch, untranslated): Atheist Manifesto and the Unreasonableness of Religion by Herman Philipse
Atheist Manifesto: The Case Against Christianity, Judaism, and Islam (French: Traité d'athéologie; 2005), a book by Michel Onfray
"An Atheist Manifesto" (2005), essay by Sam Harris

See also 
 Atheism
 Atheist (disambiguation)